André Mauprey (19 August 1881 – 3 February 1939) was a French writer, composer, librettist, and actor.  He helped to popularize The Three Penny Opera, and was the first to translate many of its songs into French.

Working with Robert de Mackiels and Serge Veber, he wrote the lyrics for the operetta Tip-Toes based on the melodies of George Gershwin.

His music and lyrics were sung by Édith Piaf, Juliette Gréco, Marianne Oswald, Marlene Dietrich, and Mathé Altéry.

Discography
Most widely held works with lyrics by Andre Mauprey

 Complainte De Mackie (Mack the Knife)
 J'ai Laisse Mon Coeur
 Je T'ai Donné Mon Coeur 
 Surabaya-Johnny
 Le Jazz Me Porte A La Peau
 Chanson De Barbara
 La Fiancée Du Pirate
 Jalousie

Selected filmography
André Mauprey was a versatile artist, contributing as a writer, lyricist, composer, and actor to many films in the 1920s and 30s.

 Screenplay
 Le Baron tzigane (1935)
 Le Cavalier Lafleur (1934)
 Princesse Czardas (1934) 
 L’Opéra de quat’sous (1931)

 Composer
 En m'en foutant

 Lyricist
 La belle aventure (1932) 
 Amourous Adventure (1932) 
 I Kiss Your Hand, Madame (1929)
 By Rocket to the Moon (1929)
 
 Actor
 Midnight, Place Pigalle (1934)

References

External links
 
 André Mauprey at WorldCat

Musicians from Paris
French songwriters
Male songwriters
French composers
French operetta composers
French male film actors
1881 births
1939 deaths
20th-century French male actors
French librettists